Clifton Jeffery (10 January 1913 – 11 February 1987) was an Australian cricketer. He played fifteen first-class matches for Tasmania between 1932 and 1947.

See also
 List of Tasmanian representative cricketers

References

External links
 

1913 births
1987 deaths
Australian cricketers
Tasmania cricketers
Cricketers from Hobart